

224001–224100 

|-id=027
|  224027 Grégoire ||  || Grégoire Boissenot (born 1979), better known as Grégoire, is a French composer, author and singer. || 
|-id=067
| 224067 Colemila ||  || Cole Osmonson (born 2016) and Mila Rodriguez (born 2016) are great-grandchildren of the discoverer || 
|}

224101–224200 

|-bgcolor=#f2f2f2
| colspan=4 align=center | 
|}

224201–224300 

|-id=206
|  224206 Pietchisson ||  || "Pietchisson", the name of an old isolated farmhouse in the Swiss Jura || 
|}

224301–224400 

|-bgcolor=#f2f2f2
| colspan=4 align=center | 
|}

224401–224500 

|-bgcolor=#f2f2f2
| colspan=4 align=center | 
|}

224501–224600 

|-id=592
|  224592 Carnac ||  || Carnac, Brittany, in north-western France. The site was already inhabited in prehistoric times, and is famous for its numerous Neolithic standing stones. || 
|}

224601–224700 

|-id=617
|  224617 Micromégas ||  || Micromégas, a short humoristic tale written by the French philosopher Voltaire in 1752. || 
|-id=693
|  224693 Morganfreeman ||  || Morgan Freeman (born 1937), an American actor and director, nominated for Academy Awards five times, winning once for Million Dollar Baby (2004). || 
|}

224701–224800 

|-bgcolor=#f2f2f2
| colspan=4 align=center | 
|}

224801–224900 

|-id=831
|  224831 Neeffisis ||  ||  (1782–1849), a German physician, co-founder of the physics society "Physikalischer Verein" in 1824. || 
|-id=888
|  224888 Cochingchu ||  || Coching Chu or Zhu Kezhen (1890–1974), a prominent Chinese meteorologist, geologist and educator || 
|}

224901–225000 

|-id=962
| 224962 Michaelgrünewald ||  || Michael Grünewald (born 1965), the son-in-law of German discoverer Rolf Apitzsch || 
|}

References 

224001-225000